Séamus Dwyer (15 November 1886 – 20 December 1922) was an Irish politician. Serving as an intelligence officer for the Dublin Brigade of the Irish Republican Army, and as a Dáil Court judge he was imprisoned by the British in 1921. He was elected unopposed at the 1921 elections for the Dublin County constituency as a Sinn Féin Teachta Dála (TD) in the 2nd Dáil. He voted in favour of the Anglo-Irish Treaty. He stood as a pro-Treaty Sinn Féin candidate at the 1922 general election but was not elected.

On 20 December 1922 he was shot dead in his shop at 5 Rathmines Road, Dublin, by anti-Treaty IRA Volunteer Robert Bonfield. "At about 4.50 pm Mr O'Dwyer was talking to a customer when a young man enter the shop, addressing O'Dwyer the young man asked 'Are you Mr O'Dwyer?'. O'Dwyer replied yes and the young man said I have a note for you. The young man reached into the pocket of his overcoat a drew a revolver, he fired twice at O'Dwyer at point-blank range. O'Dwyer died instantly. The customer and a shop assistant gave chase but were unable to catch the assassin. Two republicans, Frank Lawlor and the actual assassin, Robert Bonfield, were later killed by Free State forces in revenge for the shooting of Dwyer.

O'Dwyer ran a off-licence/grocery shop in Rathmines. He was a member of Rathmines Urban Council. O'Dwyer married Marie Molloy in 1914, they had no children. He was a member of the Peace Committee of ten men which sat in May 1922 which brought about the agreement between Michael Collins and Éamon de Valera.

References

1886 births
1922 deaths
Early Sinn Féin TDs
Members of the 2nd Dáil
Politicians from County Dublin
People murdered in Ireland
1920s murders in Ireland
1922 murders in Europe
1922 crimes in Ireland
People from Rathmines
Deaths by firearm in Ireland
People educated at Blackrock College